The investiture of Charles, Prince of Wales, took place in Caernarfon Castle, north Wales, on 1 July 1969. The ceremony formally presented the title of Prince of Wales to the 20-year-old Charles, eldest son of Queen Elizabeth II. He was the 21st heir to the English or British throne to hold the title. The investiture was a revival of a ceremony which had first been used for the previous prince of Wales, Edward (Charles's great-uncle), in 1911. The 1969 event was watched by 500 million people worldwide on television, but it received opposition in particular from Welsh nationalist organisations.

Background
The title Prince of Wales is one that has traditionally been bestowed to the male heir apparent of the English or British monarch, since Edward I of England gave his son Edward of Caernarfon the title in 1284. The bestowal is not automatic, however, nor hereditary. Edward had been born in Caernarfon Castle in 1284, possibly a deliberate statement by Edward I to the recently conquered Welsh. The Prince of Wales title came with the royal lands in Wales, as well as the title Earl of Chester. The Prince of Wales spent five weeks in Caernarfon in 1301 but would never return again.

After rising against the English, native Welshman Owain Glyndwr proclaimed himself Prince of Wales in 1400 but, since his defeat in 1409, the title has reverted to a ceremonial one, given to heirs of the English throne.

Queen Elizabeth II made her eldest son, Charles, Prince of Wales and Earl of Chester by letters patent on 26 July 1958 when he was only nine years old. He was the 21st to be given the title. Elizabeth's uncle Edward, the future King Edward VIII, had been the previous Prince of Wales and had been invested in the title at Caernarfon Castle in 1911 before becoming King in 1936. The 1911 ceremony was a new invention, though using medieval symbolism, which would be repeated by Charles's investiture in 1969.

The investiture was preceded by a year-long promotional campaign called "Croeso '69" (Welcome '69) designed to raise the profile of Wales and promote tourism. The UK's Labour government had ambitions to modernise Britain, including Wales where old industries were being replaced by new businesses and technology.

The 1911 gold coronet, having gone missing, needed to be replaced in 1969, though by one with a modern design.  After the death of the Duke of Windsor – the former Edward VIII – in 1972, the old coronet was found in his possessions.

Ten days prior to the investiture, a documentary co-produced by the BBC and ITV called Royal Family was broadcast, showing the royals going about their everyday lives. It raised the royal family to the forefront of the public eye.

Event

Charles was formally invested with the title Prince of Wales at a ceremony at Caernarfon Castle on 1 July 1969. The event was organised by a specially established Investiture Committee, chaired by the earl marshal, Bernard Fitzalan-Howard, 16th Duke of Norfolk. With a growing national consciousness rising in Wales at the time, the investiture needed to celebrate both the pride in Wales and the current British monarchy.

Charles's uncle Lord Snowdon, being a professional photographer, arranged the ceremony to be television-friendly. The ceremony took place on a circular slate dais shielded by a large modern canopy of perspex which allowed the audience and television cameras to watch the proceedings.

Prior to the investiture, Charles spent nine weeks at Aberystwyth University learning to speak the Welsh language, taught by Welsh nationalist Dr Tedi Millward. Charles consequently was able to give a speech at the investiture, in Welsh and English, where he pledged "to associate [himself] in word and deed with as much of the life of the Principality as possible".

For an hour prior to the arrival of the royal family, a procession of dignitaries and guests paraded through the town and entered the castle through the Water Gate, led by the king's heralds with a guard of honour of the Welsh Guards. Several dozen teenagers followed, representatives of Welsh youth. Then came the invited members of the House of Lords, the members and aldermen of Caernarvon Borough Council, members of the Gorsedd and the National Eisteddfod Court, chairmen of the 13 Welsh county councils, county sheriffs and the Welsh MPs. Church representatives arrived, then the prime minister, Harold Wilson, and his wife, Mary; the home secretary, James Callaghan; and the chiefs of staff of the armed forces.

Members of the royal family arrived in a fleet of four cars, led by the lord lieutenant of Caernarvonshire. Finally Charles arrived in an open carriage accompanied by his equerry, David Checketts, and the secretary of state for Wales, George Thomas, to a rendition of God Bless the Prince of Wales by the Band of the Welsh Guards.

In front of the invited audience of 4,000 people inside the castle, Charles came to the stage and knelt on a scarlet cushion. The secretary of state for Wales read the Letters Patent in Welsh as the Queen gave Charles a golden rod, a mantle, a sword, a girdle, the new coronet and a ring. The prince then took an oath, announcing:

The prince kissed his mother on the cheek before being led by the Queen to the balcony of the Queen's Gate to greet the crowds waiting outside the castle. He later sat himself on a throne, between two further thrones occupied by the Queen to one side and his father, the Duke of Edinburgh, sitting to the other side.

The ceremony was broadcast live on BBC television, in black and white on BBC1 and in colour on BBC2, from 10:30am until 4:30pm. It was also broadcast on BBC Radio 3 and bilingually on BBC Radio 4 Wales. It had an audience of 19 million in the UK and 500 million worldwide. Though 250,000 visitors were predicted for Caernarfon, only about 90,000 visited the town to see the event for themselves. It was believed many people chose to watch the ceremony at home on television instead.

Following the event, Charles spent four days touring Wales by car, helicopter and the royal yacht. Leaving the royal yacht in Llandudno the day after the investiture (and rejoining the yacht at various points on the trip), the Prince visited Newtown, New Quay, St Davids, Gelli Aur, Llanelli, Swansea, Merthyr Tydfil (Cyfarthfa Castle), Newport and Cardiff. He ended the tour with a presentation at the City Hall and a concert at the New Theatre.

Royal guests

British royal family
 The Queen and The Duke of Edinburgh, the Prince of Wales's parents
 The Princess Anne, the Prince of Wales's sister
 Queen Elizabeth The Queen Mother, the Prince of Wales's maternal grandmother
 The Princess Margaret, Countess of Snowdon and The Earl of Snowdon, the Prince of Wales's maternal aunt and uncle
 Viscount Linley, the Prince of Wales's first cousin
 Lady Sarah Armstrong-Jones, the Prince of Wales's first cousin
 The Duchess of Gloucester, the Prince of Wales's maternal great-aunt by marriage
 Prince Richard of Gloucester, the Prince of Wales's first cousin once removed
 The Prince George, Duke of Kent's family:
 The Duke and Duchess of Kent, the Prince of Wales's first cousin once removed and his wife
 Princess Alexandra, The Hon. Mrs. Ogilvy and The Hon. Angus Ogilvy, the Prince of Wales's first cousin once removed and her husband
 Prince Michael of Kent, the Prince of Wales's first cousin once removed
 The Earl Mountbatten of Burma, the Prince of Wales's paternal great-uncle

Other royal guests
  Princess Marie-Astrid of Luxembourg (representing the Grand Duke of Luxembourg)

Diplomats and politicians
  Hubert Humphrey, former Vice President of the United States and his wife, Muriel Humphrey
  Tricia Nixon, daughter of President of the United States Richard Nixon
  The Rt Hon. Harold Wilson, Prime Minister of the United Kingdom and his wife, Mary Wilson
  The Rt Hon. James Callaghan, Home Secretary of the United Kingdom

Opposition

The investiture faced fierce opposition from people who saw the Prince of Wales as symbolic of Wales's occupation by the English crown. Nationalist anti-English sentiment had been on the rise, particularly since 1957 when a Welsh valley was flooded to provide water for the English city of Liverpool. Charles later recalled "most days there seemed to be a demonstration going on against me" when he was studying at Aberystwyth University.

In November 1967, as the Earl of Snowdon visited Cardiff to discuss arrangements for the investiture, a bomb went off.

The Welsh language youth festival, the Urdd Eisteddfod, elected not to send representatives to the investiture. But, due to their 1969 festival taking place in Aberystwyth where Charles was studying, the prince was invited to speak at the event. Protests erupted at the moment Charles started his speech, with two large groups simultaneously walking out shouting slogans including "Urdd has been betrayed". The 25-year-old campaigner and singer, Dafydd Iwan, wrote a satirical song called "Carlo" which became a popular anthem at the time.

Campaigning was led by Mudiad Amddiffyn Cymru (MAC, Movement for the Defence of Wales) and the Free Wales Army, with the situation described before the investiture as "something close to open warfare between the Government's police and young people of Wales".

The day before the 1969 investiture two members of MAC, were killed when their home-made bomb exploded prematurely in Abergele, while they were planting it on a local government building. There were false speculations that they had intended to blow up the royal train.

On the day of the ceremony, a young man threw an egg at the Queen's carriage, and he was leapt upon by the surrounding crowd. Helicopters flew overhead, drain covers in Caernarfon were sealed, and radio stations were surrounded by barbed wire, which meant a planned storming of Caernarfon Castle was impossible.

In popular culture
The Prince of Wales's investiture was recreated during season 3 of the Netflix television series, The Crown. Episode 6, named Tywysog Cymru (Prince of Wales) was first broadcast in November 2019, and portrays Charles's attendance at Aberystwyth University where he learnt to speak Welsh. The episode diverts from reality by showing Charles rewriting a Welsh-only speech to express an affinity with the Welsh struggle against oppression.

See also
 1969 Investiture Honours
 Investiture of the Prince of Wales
 Opposition to the Prince of Wales title

References

1969 in Wales
July 1969 events in the United Kingdom
Charles III
Ceremonies in the United Kingdom
Caernarfon
Elizabeth II